Mahir Günok (born 14 March 1963) is a Turkish former association football player and  coach.

Personal life
Mahir Günok is the father of Turkish international Mert Günok, who plays at İstanbul Başakşehir F.K. as of 2020–21 Süper Lig season.

Honours
Trabzonspor
Turkish Cup (1): 1991–92

References
Citations

External links

Mahir Günok at Soccerway
Mahir Günok at Maçkolik

1963 births
Living people
Turkish footballers
Association football goalkeepers
Süper Lig players
Trabzonspor footballers